Josep Pliverić (Nova Gradiška, 4 February 1847 – Zagreb, 17 July 1907) was a Croatian lawyer, university professor, theorist of the Croatian state law and a Member of Croatian Parliament. Pliverić was rector of the University of Zagreb in the academic years 1892/1839 and 1904/1905, a professor at the Faculty of Law, member of the Croatian Parliament from 1892 until 1906 and elected Croatian member of the Diet of Hungary in Budapest.

References

Further reading
 

1847 births
1907 deaths
19th-century Croatian people
Croatian lawyers
Rectors of the University of Zagreb